Kenyi may be,

Kenyi language
Kenyi Cichlid (fish)
Michael Roberto Kenyi, South Sudanese politician